Svalbarðseyri is a small village in the Svalbarðsstrandarhreppur municipality, northern Iceland, which in January 2011 had 245 inhabitants.

It is located on the east coast of Eyjafjörður fjord.

References

Populated places in Northeastern Region (Iceland)